.lk is the Internet country code top-level domain (ccTLD) for Sri Lanka. Foreign companies who do not have a local presence can only reserve their top-level and corresponding open second-level domains (either through the LK Domain Registry or agents). In order to register and use a name they must have a contact address in Sri Lanka (which may be obtained through an agent or law firm).

Second-level domains

Registrations are taken at the second level and also at the third level beneath various categorized second level names.  A second-level registration automatically blocks the name from registration by anybody else under any of the third-level names.

These second-level names are available for registrations within them:

Restricted registration:
 .gov.lk: Governmental departments of Sri Lanka (automatically reserves name at second level and under all other second level names)
 .ac.lk: Research and higher education institutions in Sri Lanka
 .sch.lk: Registered schools in Sri Lanka
 .net.lk: Licensed internet service providers in Sri Lanka
 .int.lk: International treaty organizations

Open registration:
 .com.lk: Commercial entities
 .org.lk: Noncommercial organizations
 .edu.lk: Educational sites
 .ngo.lk: Non-governmental organizations
 .soc.lk: Registered societies
 .web.lk: Web sites
 .ltd.lk: Limited liability companies
 .assn.lk: Associations
 .grp.lk: Groups of companies
 .hotel.lk: Hotels

Internationalized top-level domains
In September 2010 two new internationalized top-level domains were registered for Sri Lanka. They became active during 2011.
 .ලංකා (for domain names in the Sinhala language)
 .இலங்கை (for domain names in the Tamil language)

References

External links
 IANA .lk whois information
 Authorized Agent .LK

Country code top-level domains
Internet in Sri Lanka
Computer-related introductions in 1990

sv:Toppdomän#L